Acrolepiopsis mauli is a moth of the family Acrolepiidae that is endemic to  Madeira.

References

Acrolepiidae
Endemic fauna of Madeira
Moths described in 2001
Moths of Africa